Ma'ali Al Wazir is an Egyptian feature film, released on 2 February 2003, produced by Egyptian Media Production City, starred by Ahmed Zaki.

Plot 
Rafat Rostom becomes a minister by a mistake as they mistake him for another person with the same name, and he starts having intense nightmares about  his health and his family. Ra’fat asks his office manager Ateya to accompany him on a vacation to fight these nightmares. he finds out that sleeping in mosques and in police custody keeps him away from nightmares. Ra’fat decides finally to consult a psychiatrist, so he tells Ateya all his secrets and asks him to go to the psychiatrist and act on his behalf. ultimately Ra’fat gets paranoid that Ateya will sell his secrets to the media, so he request to have Ateya killed by a hitman.

Awards 
Ma'ali Al Wazir won 6 awards in 51st Egyptian Catholic Center Cinema Festival, it won:

 Best film
 Best actor 
 Best screenplay
 Best director

See also 
 List of Egyptian films of the 2000s
Lists of Egyptian films
Cinema of Egypt

References

External links 
 https://www.imdb.com/title/tt0355715/

Egyptian mystery drama films
2003 films